Kissy is a neighborhood on the eastern end of the capital Freetown in Sierra Leone. It is also home to numerous health services, including a United Methodist Church Health and Maternity ward as well as Kissy Mental Hospital. It is also home to over 500 Liberian refugees. The Kissy Road Church of the Holy Trinity is located in Kissy Village and it should not be confused with the Church of the Holy Trinity on Kissy Road which in 1999 was completely burned down by RUF rebel forces. A restoration plan was put in place to restore that church and the building has been restored. The church on Kissy Road also ran a school.

History

Kissy was founded in 1816 to provide accommodation for recaptives, liberated enslaved Africans, who had been brought to Freetown by the British Royal Navy West Africa Squadron. The Kissy Lunatic Asylum, the first Lunatic Asylum established in colonial Sub-Saharan Africa, was established here in 1820. It originally catered for both mentally and physically ill people who could not look after themselves. The Asylum was classified as a Colonial hospital in 1844. As the British expanded their colonial holdings, the catchment area of the asylum came to encompass the whole of British West Africa.

Ferry 

There is a ferry from Kissy in the south to Tagrin Point at the north of the harbour. At Tagrin Point, taxis are readily available to take passengers to Lungi International Airport.

References

External links 
 "Welcome to UMC Health and Maternity Center, Kissy, Sierra Leone"
 "Sierra Leone IVD celebration highlights refugees' voluntary contribution"
 Official site of the italian Giuseppini del Murialdo's mission in Kissy

Kissy town
Kissy town
Sierra Leone Liberated African villages
Populated places established by Sierra Leone Creoles